This list of kings of Epirus below includes all kings and queens, along with princes and princesses until the last representative of the royal Aeacid dynasty whereupon a democracy was established. In 168 BC Epirus became the Roman province of Epirus Vetus.

Epirus regained its statehood in 1205, ruled by the Despot of Epirus.

See also
List of ancient Epirotes

References

History-related lists
Epirus
Lists of ancient people
Kings of Epirus